Thomas Grant may refer to:

Sports
 Tom Grant (baseball) (born 1957), American baseball player
 Thomas Grant (cricketer) (1879–1934), Australian cricketer
 Oliver Grant (rugby union) (Thomas Oliver Grant, born 1933), Scottish rugby player
 Thomas Grant (footballer) (born 1995), Scottish footballer
 Tommy Grant (Canadian football) (1935–2011), Canadian football player
 Tommy Grant (ice hockey) (born 1986), Canadian ice hockey player

Other
 Sir Thomas Tassell Grant (1795–1859), English inventor
 Thomas Grant (bishop) (1816–1870), Catholic bishop
 Thomas Vincent Grant (1876–1966), Canadian senator
 Thomas Grant (barrister) (born 1969), English barrister and author
 Tom Grant (jazz musician) (born 1946), American smooth jazz pianist and vocalist
 Tommy Grant (EastEnders) (appeared 2004), character in the television series EastEnders